Basil Stuart Hetzel  (13 June 1922 – 4 February 2017) was an Australian medical researcher who made a major contribution to combating iodine deficiency, a major cause of goitre and cretinism worldwide.

Early life and education
Hetzel was born in London to Elinor Hetzel (née Watt) and Kenneth Stuart Hetzel, an anaesthetist. Hetzel's parents were originally from South Australia but in London at the time while Kenneth worked at the University College Hospital. They returned to Adelaide in 1925. There he, along with his brother Peter (born 1924), was schooled at King's College and St Peter's College, Adelaide.

Hetzel studied medicine at the University of Adelaide from 1940 to 1944. As a medical student, he was granted reserved occupation status during World War II. He later applied to join the Royal Australian Air Force as a medical officer but was denied on grounds of being unfit due to a long bout of pulmonary tuberculosis in 1945.

He was a Fulbright Research Scholar in the 1950s which included an appointment at New York Hospital. In 1954, Hetzel and his family travelled to London where he undertook a Research Fellowship in the Department of Endocrinology and Metabolism at St Thomas' Hospital.

Career
His first job after completing medical studies was as a Resident Medical Officer at Parkside Mental Hospital from 1946 to 1947. Upon completion of his Fulbright Scholar commitments, Hetzel was appointed as the first Michell Research Scholar at the University of Adelaide, where he remained for three years. He then undertook the role of Reader in Medicine at the Queen Elizabeth Hospital, Adelaide before moving to Monash University as the Foundation Professor of Social and Preventive Medicine. In 2001, the Queen Elizabeth Hospital established the Basil Hetzel Institute for Medical Research in his honour.

In 1956, Hetzel became a founding member of the South Australian Mental Health Association, and along with other members, went on to assist with the establishment of the crisis support service Lifeline which still runs today.

He also held the position of first chief of the CSIRO Division of Human Nutrition. Hetzel was the Chancellor of the University of South Australia from 1992, shortly after its establishment, until 1998. In 2005, the building for health sciences at the university's City East campus was named the Basil Hetzel building and the campus library also has a Hetzel room which contains a collection of his research. Hetzel was Lieutenant Governor of South Australia from April 1992 to May 2000. He was chair of the Bob Hawke Prime Ministerial Centre from 1998 to 2007.

Research
Hetzel worked in remote areas of Papua New Guinea with the Public Health Department of the then Territory, and his research concluded that the endemic goitre and associated cretinism was attributable to an iodine deficient diet. He also demonstrated that dietary supplementation would entirely prevent these illnesses.

In the 1980s Hetzel, supported by the Australian Agency for International Development, became an international advocate for iodine supplementation, which is now taken for granted with iodinated table salt. This was part of the stimulus for the creation of the Iodine Global Network, then called the International Council for Control of Iodine Deficiency Disorders (ICCIDD), which is funded by various government, non-government and community organisations including the United Nations, the Global Alliance for Improved Nutrition, UNICEF, the World Health Organization, and the World Bank. The ICCIDD is considered the expert body regarding iodine deficiency disorders and they implement national programs for the prevention of iodine deficiency. As a result of their advocacy, many countries have now legislated that salt for human and animal consumption must be iodised. Much of this success has been attributed to Hetzel's "indefatigable dedication to elimination of iodine deficiency disorders." In 2010, the ICCIDD established a Basil Hetzel International Award for Communications for individuals who contribute to promoting awareness of iodine nutrition. It is claimed that iodine supplementation has been achieved in 70% of households worldwide by 2000.

In the 1960s, he led research in Papua New Guinea that identified the link between iodine deficiency and significant brain damage in unborn children.

Personal life
Hetzel married Mary Helen Eyles in 1946. Together they had five children; Susan (born 1947), Richard (born 1949), Robert (born 1951), Jay (born 1952) and Elizabeth (born 1956). Helen died of cancer in December 1980. In 1983 Hetzel married again, to Anne Fisher, the widow of the headmaster of Geelong Grammar School, Charles Fisher.

Hetzel was a member of Pilgrim Uniting Church in Adelaide.

Hetzel died on 4 February 2017, aged 94.

Honours
 Pollin Prize for Pediatric Research, 2009
 Prince Mahidol Award from King Bhumibol Adulyadej of Thailand
 National Trust as a National Living Treasure, 15 March 2004
 The Clinical Research Centre at the Queen Elizabeth Hospital was named 'The Basil Hetzel Institute for Medical Research' in his honour, 2001
 Doctor of the University, University of South Australia, 1999
 RSL Anzac Peace Prize, 1997
 Companion of the Order of Australia, 1990
 Honorary Professor at the Tianjin Medical University, 1989
 Susman Prize for Medical Research, Royal Australasian College of Physicians, 1964
 Alwyn Smith Prize, Faculty of Public Health Medicine, United Kingdom, 1993

References

External links
 Basil Hetzel Archival Collection at the University of South Australia
 ABC Radio National Nexus In Person Interview with Dr Basil Hetzel 26 March 2004
 Profile on ABC TV Stateline SA 24 October 2003
 The Hetzel Family's Friendship with China on www.china.org.cn
 National Trust List of National Living Treasures

1922 births
2017 deaths
Australian scientists
Companions of the Order of Australia
Fellows of the Royal Australasian College of Physicians
Australian Fellows of the Royal College of Physicians
Fellows of the Australian Academy of Technological Sciences and Engineering
Academic staff of Monash University
Scientists from Adelaide
University of Adelaide Medical School alumni
Australian public health doctors
People educated at St Peter's College, Adelaide
Lieutenant-Governors of South Australia
British emigrants to Australia
Australian expatriates in the United States